Mossy Stonecrop may refer to:

 Crassula tillaea
 Sedum acre
 Sedum lydium